How the Killing of the Old Men Was Stopped is a Serbian fairy tale that first appeared in Kazadzic, a journal of Serbian folklore, having been submitted by Mr. I. L. Szeckovic from Paracin.  It is Aarne-Thompson type 981, the Killing of Old Men.

Synopsis
A man hid his father in a land where everyone was supposed to be put to death at fifty.  He won a bet about first seeing the sunrise by following his father's advice and looking west, so he saw it on a mountaintop.  People concluded that the old should no longer be put to death.

Motifs
This story type is known the world over, and although the precise problem solved by the old man differs, the lesson is invariably the same:  to cherish the old as a source of wisdom.

References

External links
 Other stories of this type

Serbian fairy tales
ATU 850-999